"Body and Soul" is a song by American recording artist Anita Baker, released in 1994 as the lead single in support of her fifth album, Rhythm of Love (1994). The song received critical acclaim, peaking at number four on the US Billboard Hot Black Singles chart and number 36 on the Billboard Hot 100. It earned Baker another top 40 pop hit following 1988's "Just Because", which peaked to number 14 on the same chart. In Europe, "Body and Soul" charted in the UK, reaching number 48 on the UK Singles Chart.

Critical reception
Larry Flick from Billboard wrote, "What a pleasure it is to welcome Baker back to the fold. On this glorious peek into her new Rhythm Of Love opus, she gives us the beautiful tones that have set her apart from the typical R&B diva, warmly embracing a soothing retro-pop ballad arrangement. A bit more adult and sophisticated than top 40 is currently programming, but we pray that tastemakers will make room for something so creatively satisfying. It's so rare that we are given music of this high caliber." Steve Baltin from Cash Box said, "Clearly Baker from the first note, the song stands out in the crowded R&B field because of its slightly jazzy feel. A winner all the way." 

Caroline Sullivan from The Guardian remarked that "her lazy phrasing deftly lifts the string-saturated "Body and Soul" out of Whitney Houston-ville". Chuck Campbell from Knoxville News Sentinel felt the singer "flaunts her power belting" on the song. Pan-European magazine Music & Media commented, "Soul music's best female balladeer gives a lesson in body language. Advise listeners of lovers' radio to dim the lights, move their body gently and let their heart speak." James Hamilton from Music Week'''s RM Dance Update described it as a "gorgeous bluesy piano played wailing husky gospel-jazz-soul waltz". Jonathan Bernstein from Spin'' named it a "standout" track of the album, declaring it as a "slowburning classic".

Charts

Weekly charts

Year-end charts

References

External links
 www.AnitaBaker.com

1994 singles
Anita Baker songs
Songs written by Ellen Shipley
Songs written by Rick Nowels
1994 songs
Contemporary R&B ballads
1990s ballads
Elektra Records singles